One Sunday Afternoon is a 1933 American pre-Code romantic comedy-drama film directed by Stephen Roberts and starring Gary Cooper and Fay Wray. Based on the 1933 Broadway play by James Hagan, the film is about a middle-aged dentist who reminisces about his unrequited love for a beautiful woman and his former friend who betrayed him and married her. This pre-Code film was released by Paramount Pictures on September 1, 1933.

Plot
Dr. Lucius Griffith "Biff" Grimes (Gary Cooper) is a small town dentist dissatisfied with his lot. Though married to the lovely and affectionate Amy Lind Grimes (Frances Fuller), Grimes still carries a torch for his former sweetheart, Virginia "Virgie" Brush Barnstead (Fay Wray). Years earlier, Grimes had lost Virgie to his old friend Hugo Barnstead (Neil Hamilton), and is consumed with the desire to get even with his rival. The now-wealthy Hugo has a dental emergency and comes to see Grimes, who comes close to killing his old rival with gas. The story of their past is told in flashback while the anesthetic is taking effect.

Cast
 Gary Cooper as Dr. Lucius Griffith "Biff" Grimes
 Fay Wray as Virginia "Virgie" Brush Barnstead
 Frances Fuller as Amy Lind Grimes
 Roscoe Karns as Snappy Downer
 Neil Hamilton as Hugo Barnstead, Owner Phoenix Carriage Factory
 Jane Darwell as Mrs. Lind, Amy's Mother
 Ed Brady as Pig Contest Emcee (uncredited) 
 Robert Homans as Officer Charlie Brown (uncredited)

Reception
The film was a box office disappointment for Paramount.

Mordaunt Hall reviewed the film for The New York Times in September 1933, while the play was still running, and it suffered by comparison to the original: 
...Hollywood loses no time in picturing a good play... One might venture that the studio chieftains have been a little too hasty in this case, for, although the shadow conception of "One Sunday Afternoon" is not without merit, it often fails in the dramatic impact given in the original, especially in the closing episodes. Like the film versions of one or two other plays... There are periods that are unnecessarily short and others that do not deserve the footage they receive.
Leonard Maltin gives it three out of four stars, praising Cooper's performance in a "Touching and lovingly made piece of Americana, exuding period charm and atmosphere, though darker in tone than the two Warner Bros. remakes by Raoul Walsh: "

Original and Remakes
The hit play One Sunday Afternoon, starring Lloyd Nolan, ran on Broadway from Feb. 15 to November 1933. Written by James Hagan (1888–1947), it had great success beyond its Broadway run . The New York Times' critic Brooke Atkinson called it "a light and charming little fable" and "uncommonly refreshing." It was translated into Yiddish and retitled One Sabbath Afternoon. A 1939 production of the Yiddish version also received high praise from The New York Times.

Film Director Raoul Walsh made two versions, the smash hit Strawberry Blonde (1941) with James Cagney as Biff, and a Technicolor  musical starring Dennis Morgan called One Sunday Afternoon (1948). The Gary Cooper version was a notorious flop, however; it was the only Cooper picture of this period to lose money at the box office. Before making the Cagney version, Jack L. Warner (co-founder of Warner Bros.,  who had bought the earlier version) screened the 1933 film and then wrote a memo to his production head, Hal B. Wallis, telling him to watch it: "It will be hard to stay through the entire running of the picture, but do this so you will know what not to do."

See also

 List of Pre-Code films

References

External links
 
 
 
 
 

1933 films
1933 comedy films
1933 drama films
1930s American films
1930s English-language films
1930s romantic comedy-drama films
American black-and-white films
American films about revenge
American films based on plays
American romantic comedy-drama films
Films directed by Stephen Roberts
Films set in the 1900s
Films set in the 1930s
Paramount Pictures films